Oskar Homolka (August 12, 1898 – January 27, 1978) was an Austrian film and theatre actor, who went on to work in Germany, Britain and America. Both his voice and his appearance fitted him for roles as communist spies or Soviet officials, for which he was in regular demand. By the age of 30, he had appeared in more than 400 plays; his film career covered at least 100 films and TV shows.

Career 
After serving in the Austro-Hungarian Army during the First World War, Homolka attended the Imperial Academy of Music and the Performing Arts in Vienna, the city of his birth, and began his career on the Austrian stage. In 1924 he played Mortimer in the premiere of Brecht's play The Life of Edward II of England at the Munich Kammerspiele, and from 1925 in Berlin where he worked under Max Reinhardt.

Other stage plays in which Homolka performed during this period include: The first German performance of Eugene O'Neill's The Emperor Jones, 1924, Anna Christie, 1924, 1925, Juarez and Maximilian, 1925–1926, Her Young Boyfriend, 1925, The Jewish Widow, 1925, Stir, 1925, Mérimée and Courteline, 1926, Periphery, 1926, Neidhardt von Gneisenau, 1926, Dorothea Angermann, 1926–1927, Der Revisor, 1926, Androcles and the Lion, 1926, Bonaparte, 1927, The Ringer and The Squeaker by Edgar Wallace, both 1927, Underworld, 1930, Today's Sensation, 1931, The Last Equipage, 1931, The Waterloo Bridge, 1931, Faust, 1932, Karl and Anna, Doctor's Dilemma, Pygmalion, Juno and the Paycock, and many Shakespearean plays including: A Midsummer Night's Dream, 1925, Troilus and Cressida, 1927, Richard III, King Lear, and Macbeth. After his arrival in London, he continued to star on stage, including with Flora Robson in the play Close Quarters.

His first films were Die Abenteuer eines Zehnmarkscheines (Uneasy Money, 1926), Hokuspokus (Hocuspocus, 1930), and Dreyfus (The Dreyfus Case, 1930), Zwischen Nacht und Morgen (Between Night and Dawn, 1931), Geheimdienst (Intelligence, 1931), Junge Liebe (Young Love, 1931), and Nachtkolonne (Night Column, 1932). According to Homolka's own account, he made at least thirty silent films in Germany and starred in the first talking picture ever made there.

After the Nazi party came to power in Germany, Homolka moved to Britain, where he starred in the films Rhodes of Africa, with Walter Huston, 1936; and Everything Is Thunder, with Constance Bennett, 1936. Later, he was one of the many Austrian and specifically Viennese actors and theatrical people who left Europe for the US.

In 1936, he appeared opposite Sylvia Sidney in Alfred Hitchcock's thriller Sabotage. Although he often played villains such as Communist spies and Soviet-bloc military officers or scientists, he was nominated for an Academy Award for Best Supporting Actor for his portrayal of the crusty, beloved uncle in I Remember Mama (1948).

 
He also acted with Ingrid Bergman in Rage in Heaven, with Marilyn Monroe in The Seven Year Itch, with Ronald Reagan in Prisoner of War and with Katharine Hepburn in The Madwoman of Chaillot. He returned to England in the mid-1960s, to play the Soviet KGB Colonel Stok in Funeral in Berlin (1966) and Billion Dollar Brain (1967), opposite Michael Caine. His last film was the Blake Edwards's romantic drama The Tamarind Seed in 1974.

In 1967 Homolka was awarded the Filmband in Gold of the Deutscher Filmpreis for outstanding contributions to German cinema.

His career in television included appearances in three episodes of Alfred Hitchcock Presents in 1957 and 1960, and a 1964 episode of Hazel.

Homolka was referenced in The Odd Couple. When Oscar Madison makes his desperate last call to find a date and his prospect does not recall him, Madison asks "How many Oscars do you know?"  After a pregnant pause, Madison replies, "You know Oscar Homolka?"

In 1973, he appeared in "Border Line", an episode of The Protectors, filmed in Austria.

Personal life
Homolka married four times:
 His first wife was Grete Mosheim, a German actress. They married in Berlin on 28 June 1928 but divorced in 1937. She later married Howard Gould.
 His second wife, Baroness Vally Hatvany (died 1938), was a Hungarian actress. They married in December 1937, but she died four months later.
 In 1939, Homolka married socialite and photographer Florence Meyer (1911–1962), a daughter of The Washington Post owner Eugene Meyer. They had two sons, Vincent and Laurence, but divorced after nine years of marriage.
 His last wife was actress Joan Tetzel, whom he married in 1949. The marriage lasted until Tetzel's death in 1977.

Death
Homolka made his home in Britain after 1966. He died of pneumonia in Tunbridge Wells, Kent, on January 27, 1978, three months after the death of his fourth wife, actress Joan Tetzel. He was 79 years old. He and Tetzel are buried in Christ Church churchyard, Fairwarp, East Sussex, England. Their gravestone is notable for having a pair of theatrical masks carved into the surface.

Filmography

See also
 List of Academy Award winners and nominees from German-speaking countries

References

External links

 
 Oskar Homolka at BFI
 
 
 
 Photographs of Oskar Homolka
 The New York Times obituary, January 1, 1978
 Oskar Homolka on Filmreference.com

1898 births
1978 deaths
Austro-Hungarian military personnel of World War I
Austrian male film actors
Austrian male silent film actors
Austrian male stage actors
Austrian people of Czech descent
Male actors from Vienna
Deaths from pneumonia in England
20th-century Austrian male actors
Newmark family